Pteroloma is a genus of carrion beetles.

References

External links

Staphylinoidea
Staphyliniformia genera